Acrocercops viatica is a moth of the family Gracillariidae. It is known from India (Karnataka).

References

viatica
Moths described in 1916
Moths of Asia